Alice Yvonne Bentinck  (born 23 July 1986) is a British entrepreneur. Along with Matthew Clifford, she is the co-founder of Entrepreneur First, a London-based company builder and startup accelerator. Based in London and Singapore, EF funds ambitious individuals based across Europe and Asia to create startups. In 2017, it was announced that Reid Hoffman, co-founder of LinkedIn and Partner at Greylock, was leading a $12.4million investment into Entrepreneur First.

Bentinck and Clifford are also the founders of Code First: Girls, an organisation offering free web programming courses for women in university. An advocate for the entry of more women to the tech field, Bentinck was named one of the Fifty Most Inspiring Women in European Tech by the Inspiring Fifty organisation in 2015.

Early life and education
The daughter of Major Vivian Mark Bentinck, of the Royal Marines (a descendant of Admiral Sir Rudolph Bentinck, Commander-in-Chief, Plymouth, of the Barons Bentinck) and Dr Miranda Whitehead, Bentinck grew up in the New Forest region of southern England. She attended the Godolphin School in Salisbury, an all-girls boarding school. There she enrolled in Young Enterprise, creating a business model for handmade purses. She then attended the Nottingham University Business School, graduating with a bachelor of arts in management studies, with first class honours.

Career
Prior to founding EF, Bentinck interned in the office of Tony Blair in London, where she also assisted the Africa Governance Initiative. From 2009 to 2011 she was a management consultant in the London office of McKinsey & Company.

Bentinck and Clifford met in 2009 while working at McKinsey. After noticing that entrepreneurship was not seen as a viable career option for talented and ambitious individuals in Europe, unlike in Silicon Valley, they decided to found Entrepreneur First in 2011. Bentinck serves as CPO while Clifford is CEO. As of 2022, Entrepreneur First's combined portfolio is worth over $6b.

Entrepreneur First's first international office was opened in Singapore in 2016, bringing the same company building model to Asia.

In 2017, it was announced that Reid Hoffman, co-founder of LinkedIn and Partner at Greylock, was leading a $12.4million investment into Entrepreneur First. As part of his investment, Hoffman also joined the board of EF.

Noticing that most individuals applying to Entrepreneur First were male, Bentinck and Clifford founded Code First Girls in 2012. The non-profit is the largest provider of free coding courses for women in the UK, delivering over £20 million worth of free technology education and teaching three times as many women to code as the entire UK university undergraduate system. Code First Girls has now taught over 25,000 women to code. Since 2015, Bentinck has also served on their board.

In February 2022, Bentinck was announced as a member of Prime Minister Boris Johnson's Business  Council, a group of industry leaders working in partnership with the government to deliver high productivity and growth in the UK.

Other activities
In 2014 Bentinck was appointed one of the Prime Minister's advisors for the Northern Future Forum in Helsinki.

She has been a member of the advisory board of Founders4Schools since April 2014, and a member of the Computer Science Department Industrial Liaison Board at Imperial College London since April 2015. In September 2015 she became a mentor for Girls in Tech London.

Honours and awards
In 2015 she was named one of the Fifty Most Inspiring Women in European Tech by the Inspiring Fifty organisation.

In 2014 she was named to several newspaper and magazine lists. She was named one of "The 1000 – London's Most Influential People" by the London Evening Standard, one of the "35 Women Under 35" by Management Today, and was cited as a "Rising Star" by Computer Weekly as part of their 2014 Most Influential Women in UK IT campaign. Additionally, the British Interactive Media Association included her on its BIMA Hot 100 of 2014.

In 2013 she was ranked No. 19 on The Drum "30 Under 30 Women in Digital" list. She was a Top 25 finalist in the Tech City Movers and Shakers 2013 and the Girls in Tech Ones to Watch 2013.

Bentinck was appointed Member of the Order of the British Empire (MBE) in the 2016 Birthday Honours for services to business.

In 2017, Bentinck was named by Computer Weekly as one of the most influential women in UK IT. She was again named by the London Evening Standard as one of London's most influential people in the Progress 1000: Capitalisers/Entrepreneurs category.

Personal
Bentinck has participated in competitive carriage driving since her youth.

Selected articles

"Style and Facebook: Promoting Women Role Models"

References

External links

"Be a Founder, Not a Follower" 27 September 2014 speech
"Five Entrepreneurial Lessons From Alice Bentinck, The Founder Of Entrepreneur First" Career Girl Daily, 24 July 2015

1986 births
Living people
Alice
English women in business
British technology company founders
British women company founders
Alumni of the University of Nottingham
People from New Forest District
People educated at Godolphin School
Computer science education in the United Kingdom
Members of the Order of the British Empire